Harmony Area School District is a diminutive, rural, public school district located in Indiana County, Pennsylvania and Clearfield County, Pennsylvania. The district is one of the 500 public school districts of Pennsylvania and one of nine public school districts in Clearfield County. It serves residents in Cherry Tree Boro in Indiana County; as well as Westover Boro, Burnside Township, and Chest Township in Clearfield County. According to 2000 federal census data, Harmony Area School District served a resident population of 2,576. By 2010, the district's population declined to 2,343 people. The educational attainment levels for the school district population (25 years old and over) were 85.5% high school graduates and 6.8% college graduates. In 2009, Harmony Area School District residents’ per capita income was $12,775, while the median family income was $31,413. In the Commonwealth, the median family income was $49,501 and the United States median family income was $49,445, in 2010.

Schools
The district operates one combines High School Middle School and one Elementary School, all within the same building.
Harmony Area High School became combined high school and junior high school in 2014
Harmony Area Elementary School

All students attend school in a single building located at the school complex in Burnside Township.

High school students may choose to attend Clearfield County Career and Technology Center for training in the construction and mechanical trades. The Central Intermediate Unit IU10 provides the district with a wide variety of services like specialized education for disabled students and hearing, speech and visual disability services and professional development for staff and faculty.

Extracurriculars
Harmony Area School District offers a variety of clubs, activities and sports. Some sports are operated in cooperation with neighboring districts due to low student numbers. Cooperative sports include football, soccer, track and field, and wrestling.

Harmony athletics
There are baseball and softball fields on the school campus.

The following are athletics provided solely by Harmony Area:

References

External links
 Harmony Area School District
 Penna. Inter-Scholastic Athletic Assn.

School districts in Clearfield County, Pennsylvania
Clearfield County, Pennsylvania
Education in Clearfield County, Pennsylvania
School districts in Indiana County, Pennsylvania
Indiana County, Pennsylvania
Education in Indiana County, Pennsylvania
School districts established in 1952